The Come Up is the debut mixtape by rapper J. Cole released on May 4, 2007, hosted by DJ OnPoint. The mixtape has been downloaded and streamed over 500,000 times, while being viewed over 1,800,000 times on mixtape site DatPiff.

Background 
J. Cole self-produced 12 out of the 21 tracks on the mixtape, including his debut single, called "Simba", which Cole shot his first music video for it. The mixtape also features the samples from American rappers such as Kanye West, Nas, Jay-Z and Ghostface Killah, among others, while the tape includes guest appearances from Deacon and Nervous Reck.

Track listing 

Sample credits 
"I'm the Man" samples "You're da Man" by Nas.
"School Dayz" samples  "Ghetto" by Smitty featuring Scarface, Kanye West, and John Legend.
"Dollar and a Dream" samples  "Mom Praying" by Beanie Sigel featuring Scarface.
"Quote Me" samples  "Where Y'all At" by Nas.
"College Boy" samples  "Came Back for You" by Lil' Kim.
"The Come Up" samples  "Grammy Family" by Consequence featuring DJ Khaled, Kanye West, and John Legend.
"Mighty Crazy" samples  "Mighty Healthy" by Ghostface Killah.
"Dead Presidents" samples  "Dead Presidents" by Jay-Z.
"Homecoming" samples  "My Way Home" by Kanye West featuring Common.
"Carolina On My Mind" samples  "We the People Who Are Darker Than Blue" by Curtis Mayfield.
"Can't Cry" samples  "(If Loving You Is Wrong) I Don't Want to Be Right" by Millie Jackson.
"Goin' Off" samples  "If Tomorrow Never Comes" by The Controllers.
"Rags to Riches" samples  "Everybody Loves the Sunshine" by Roy Ayers.

References

External links
J. Cole
The Come Up

Debut mixtape albums
J. Cole albums
Albums produced by J. Cole
2007 mixtape albums
Dreamville Records albums